Ceres is an unincorporated community in Lewis County, in the U.S. state of Washington. It is located off Washington State Route 6 in a bend of the Chehalis River. The Willapa Hills Trail bisects the area.

History
A post office called Ceres was established in 1908, and remained in operation until 1931. The community was named by the Northern Pacific Railroad after Ceres, the Roman goddess of agriculture.

References

Populated places in Lewis County, Washington
Unincorporated communities in Lewis County, Washington
Unincorporated communities in Washington (state)